(Jesus, now be praised), is a church cantata by Johann Sebastian Bach. He composed the chorale cantata  in Leipzig for New Year's Day and first performed it on 1 January 1725 as part of his second cantata cycle. It is based on the hymn by Johannes Hermann (1591).

History and words 
Bach wrote the cantata in 1724, his second year as Thomaskantor in Leipzig, for New Year's Day. The feast also celebrated the naming and circumcision of Jesus. The prescribed readings for the feast day were from the Epistle to the Galatians, by faith we inherit, and from the Gospel of Luke, the Circumcision and naming of Jesus.

That year, Bach composed a cycle of chorale cantatas, begun on the first Sunday after Trinity of 1724. The cantata is based on the hymn for New Year's Day in three stanzas by Johannes Hermann (1591) who was also a Thomaskantor. Its melody is by Melchior Vulpius, who first published it in his , printed in Jena (1609). The hymn calls Jesus by name first, fitting to the celebration of the naming. Otherwise it is more concerned with the beginning of the New Year. An unknown poet kept the first and the last stanza as movements 1 and 6, and paraphrased stanza 2 to a sequence of alternating arias and recitatives, expanding the 14 lines by additional ideas, but not specifically referring to the gospel.

Bach first performed the cantata on 1 January 1725, and reprised it at least once, between 1732 and 1735.

Scoring and structure 
The cantata in six movements is scored for four soloists (soprano, alto, tenor and bass), a four-part choir, three trumpets, timpani, three oboes, two violins, viola, violoncello piccolo da spalla and basso continuo.

Music 
In the opening chorus, a chorale fantasia, Bach faced the problem of structuring the unusually long stanza of 14 lines and an additional repeat of the last two lines, as seems to have been customary in Leipzig. The concerto of the orchestra is dominated by a syncope fanfare motif from the trumpets. In the first four lines, repeated in the next four and the final two, the soprano sings the cantus firmus, with the lower voices in free polyphony. Lines 9 and 10, speaking of "" (in good silence) are marked adagio; the choir sings in homophony in triple meter, accompanied by the orchestra without the trumpets. Lines 11 and 12, repeated in 13 and 14, are a presto fugato, with the instruments playing colla parte, expressing "" (We want to devote ourselves to you), an "enthusiastic rededication to spiritual values". The fugal subject is derived from the first phrase of the chorale melody. Lines 15 and 16 repeat lines 1 and 2, saying "" (Protect our body, soul and life).

In contrast, both arias have been described as chamber music. The first aria is sung by the soprano, accompanied by three oboes in pastoral  time. A short secco recitative leads to a tenor aria, which is dominated by an obbligato violoncello piccolo in expansive movement. The last recitative for bass contains one line from Martin Luther's  (German litany), which Bach set for four-part choir, marked allegro, as if the congregation joined the prayer of the individual. The closing chorale corresponds to the first movement. The lines are separated several times by its trumpet motif; the trumpets are silent in lines 9 to 14; lines 11 to 14 are in  time; the final fanfare recalls the beginning.

John Eliot Gardiner notes that Bach achieves a suggestion of the year's cycle by ending both the first movement and the end of the cantata as the work began, as a "closing of the circle".

Recordings 
 Bach Made in Germany Vol. 1 – Cantatas II, Günther Ramin, Thomanerchor, Gewandhausorchester, soloists from Thomanerchor, Gert Lutze, Johannes Oettel, Leipzig Classics 1950
 Bach Aria Group – Cantatas & Cantata Movements, Robert Shaw, Bach Aria Group Robert Shaw Chorale & Orchestra, Eileen Farrell, Carol Smith, Jan Peerce, Norman Farrow, RCA 1954
 Die Bach Kantate Vol. 19, Helmuth Rilling, Gächinger Kantorei, Bach-Collegium Stuttgart, Helen Donath, Marga Höffgen, Adalbert Kraus, Siegmund Nimsgern, Hänssler 1973
 J. S. Bach: Das Kantatenwerk – Sacred Cantatas Vol. 3, Nikolaus Harnoncourt, Wiener Sängerknaben, Chorus Viennensis, Concentus Musicus Wien, soloist from Wiener Sängerknaben, Paul Esswood, Kurt Equiluz, Ruud van der Meer, Teldec 1974
 J. S. Bach: Cantatas Nos. 27, 34 & 41, Gustav Leonhardt, Tölzer Knabenchor, Baroque Orchestra, soloist from Tölzer Knabenchor, Markus Schäfer, Harry van der Kamp, Sony 1995
 J. S. Bach: Cantatas with Violoncelle Piccolo (Vol. 3), Christophe Coin, Chœur de Chambre Accentus, Ensemble Baroque de Limoges, Barbara Schlick, Andreas Scholl, Christoph Prégardien, Gotthold Schwarz, Astrée Auvidis 1995
 J. S. Bach: Complete Cantatas Vol. 11, Ton Koopman, Amsterdam Baroque Orchestra & Choir, Sibylla Rubens, Annette Markert, Christoph Prégardien, Klaus Mertens, Antoine Marchand 1999
 Bach Cantatas Vol. 17: Berlin, John Eliot Gardiner, Monteverdi Choir, English Baroque Soloists, Ruth Holton, Lucy Ballard, Charles Humphries, James Gilchrist, Peter Harvey, Soli Deo Gloria 2000
 Bach Edition Vol. 21 – Cantatas Vol. 12, Pieter Jan Leusink, Holland Boys Choir, Netherlands Bach Collegium, Ruth Holton, Sytse Buwalda, Knut Schoch, Bas Ramselaar, Brilliant Classics 2000
 J. S. Bach: Cantatas Vol. 33, Masaaki Suzuki, Bach Collegium Japan, Yukari Nonoshita, Robin Blaze, Jan Kobow, Dominik Wörner, BIS 2005

Notes

References

External links 
 
 Jesu, nun sei gepreiset BWV 41; BC A 22 / Chorale cantata (New Year/Circumcision) Bach Digital
 Cantata BWV 41 Jesu, nun sei gepreiset: history, scoring, sources for text and music, translations to various languages, discography, discussion, Bach Cantatas Website
 Luke Dahn: BWV 41.6 bach-chorales.com

Church cantatas by Johann Sebastian Bach
1725 compositions
Chorale cantatas